Enchufada is a Portuguese Independent Record Label based in Lisbon. It was founded in 2006 by Buraka Som Sistema band members Branko (João Barbosa) and Kalaf Ângelo, serving as a creative platform from which to release their early musical experiments fusing Angolan kuduro and European electronic music genres, an aesthetic that defined the early years of the imprint and set the stylistic tone for its future releases.

The label identifies its focus as global club music, an umbrella term for the many recent electronic expressions of local scenes fusing specific musical and rhythmic traditions with modern electronic club music genres. This mission statement has been especially evident in compilation series such as the Hard Ass Sessions (which takes its name from the literal translation of kuduro), where international artists gave their own interpretation of kuduro, or the more recent Upper Cuts, which combined free downloads and digital compilations including music from a host of international producers from all across the global club music spectrum.

Enchufada has released music from artists such as Buraka Som Sistema, Branko, Dengue Dengue Dengue, Dotorado Pro, T.Williams, PAUS and many more over its ten years of activity.

Discography
 Dengue Dengue Dengue - Zenith & Nadir (2019)
 Dengue Dengue Dengue - Son de los Diablos (2018)
 Dengue Dengue Dengue - Siete Raíces (2016)
 V.A. - Enchufada Upper Cuts: Four Years of Global Club Anthems (2016)
 Branko - ATLAS (2015)
 Dotorado Pro - African Scream (2015)
 Alo Wala - Cityboy (2014)
 Buraka Som Sistema - Buraka (2014)
 Branko - Control (2014)
 Dengue Dengue Dengue - Serpiente Dorada (2014)
 V.A. - Hard Ass Sessions Compilation (2012)
 Buraka Som Sistema - Komba (2011)
 Buraka Som Sistema - Black Diamond (2008)
 Buraka Som Sistema - From Buraka To The World (2006)

References

 Resident Advisor Profile - https://www.residentadvisor.net/record-label.aspx?id=5494
 Discogs Profile - https://www.discogs.com/label/69349-Enchufada
 Xlr8r Profile - https://www.xlr8r.com/tag/enchufada/
 Beatport Chart - https://www.beatport.com/label/enchufada/14237

External links
 https://web.archive.org/web/20180805135128/http://enchufada.com/
 https://web.archive.org/web/20180310110836/https://enchufada.bandcamp.com/

Portuguese record labels